Seetzen is a German surname. Notable people with the surname include:

 Heinrich Seetzen, often known as Heinz Seetzen (1906–1945), German SS officer and Holocaust perpetrator
 Helge Seetzen (born 1978), German technologist, businessman and entrepreneur
 Ulrich Jasper Seetzen (1767–1811), German explorer

German-language surnames